Jonny van Wanrooy is a Dutch mixed martial artist. He competed in the Middleweight division.

Mixed martial arts record

|-
| Loss
| align=center| 3-8 (1)
| Olivier Buanec
| Submission (armbar)
| Shooto Holland: Knock-Out Gala 3
| 
| align=center| 1
| align=center| 3:29
| Vlissingen, Netherlands
| 
|-
| Loss
| align=center| 3-7 (1)
| Nic Osei
| Submission
| VF 1: The Ultimate Challenge
| 
| align=center| 1
| align=center| 0:00
| Denmark
| 
|-
| NC
| align=center| 3-6 (1)
| Evert Fyeet
| No Contest
| Together Productions: Fight Gala
| 
| align=center| 0
| align=center| 0:00
| Zaandam, North Holland, Netherlands
| 
|-
| Loss
| align=center| 3-6
| Nathan Schouteren
| Submission (kneebar)
| Kam Lung: Only The Strongest Survive 3
| 
| align=center| 1
| align=center| 0:00
| Rhoon, South Holland, Netherlands
| 
|-
| Win
| align=center| 3-5
| Gideon Ackermans
| TKO
| FFH: Free Fight Explosion 1
| 
| align=center| 0
| align=center| 0:00
| Beverwijk, North Holland, Netherlands
| 
|-
| Loss
| align=center| 2-5
| Richard Plug
| Submission (armbar)
| Together Productions: Fight Gala
| 
| align=center| 0
| align=center| 0:00
| Zaandam, North Holland, Netherlands
| 
|-
| Loss
| align=center| 2-4
| Roberto Flamingo
| Decision
| Gym Alkmaar: Fight Gala
| 
| align=center| 0
| align=center| 0:00
| Schermerhorn, North Holland, Netherlands
| 
|-
| Loss
| align=center| 2-3
| Roberto Flamingo
| TKO (cut)
| Kam Lung: Only the Strongest Survive 2
| 
| align=center| 0
| align=center| 0:00
| Hellevoetsluis, South Holland, Netherlands
| 
|-
| Win
| align=center| 2-2
| Dave Dalgliesh
| Decision (1-0 points)
| Together Productions: Fight Gala
| 
| align=center| 2
| align=center| 5:00
| Zaandam, North Holland, Netherlands
| 
|-
| Loss
| align=center| 1-2
| Wouter Bakker
| Submission (keylock)
| Rings Holland: Who's The Boss
| 
| align=center| 1
| align=center| 0:34
| Utrecht, Netherlands
| 
|-
| Win
| align=center| 1-1
| Ronny Rivano
| Decision (unanimous)
| Rings Holland: Utrecht at War
| 
| align=center| 2
| align=center| 5:00
| Utrecht, Netherlands
| 
|-
| Loss
| align=center| 0-1
| Ron van Gellekom
| Decision (unanimous)
| Rings Holland: The Final Challenge
| 
| align=center| 1
| align=center| 10:00
| Amsterdam, North Holland, Netherlands
|

See also
List of male mixed martial artists

References

Dutch male mixed martial artists
Middleweight mixed martial artists
Living people
Place of birth missing (living people)
Year of birth missing (living people)